The 2018 United States House of Representatives elections in Indiana were held on November 6, 2018, to elect the nine U.S. representatives from the state of Indiana, one from each of the state's nine congressional districts. The elections coincided with other elections to the House of Representatives, as well as elections to the United States Senate and various state and local elections. The filing deadline for candidates was February 9, 2018. The primaries were held on May 8, 2018.

Overview

By district

Results of the 2018 United States House of Representatives elections in Indiana by district:

District 1

The incumbent is Democrat Pete Visclosky, who has represented the district since 1985. Visclosky was re-elected with 82% of the vote in 2016.

Democratic primary
 Pete Visclosky, incumbent
 Larry Chubb
 Antonio Daggett Sr., former Lieutenant Colonel in the US Army

Primary results

Republican primary
 John Meyer
 Jeremy Belko, truck driver
 David Dopp
 Roseann Ivanovich
 Mark Leyva, carpenter, steelworker, 2014 Republican Party nominee for Indiana's 1st Congressional District
 Nicholas Pappas

Primary results

General election

Results

District 2

The incumbent is Republican Jackie Walorski, who has represented the district since 2013. Walorski was re-elected with 59% of the vote in 2016.

The Democratic Congressional Campaign Committee included Indiana's 2nd congressional district on its initial list of Republican-held seats considered targets in 2018.

Democratic primary
 Douglas Carpenter
 Pat Hackett, attorney
 Mel Hall, businessman
 Yatish Joshi, businessman
 Roland Leech
 John Petroff, school bus driver

Primary results

Republican primary
 Mark Summe
 Jackie Walorski, incumbent

Primary results

General election

Results

District 3

The incumbent is Republican Jim Banks, who has represented the district since 2017. Banks was elected with 70% of the vote in 2016.

Democratic primary
 John Roberson, former police officer
 Tommy Schrader
 Courtney Tritch, businesswoman

Primary results

Republican primary
 Jim Banks, incumbent

Primary results

General election

Polling

Results

District 4

The incumbent is Republican Todd Rokita, who has represented the district since 2011. Rokita was re-elected with 65% of the vote in 2016. Rokita did not run for reelection, as he entered the Republican primary for the Indiana senate race.

Democratic primary
 Tobi Beck, security technology designer
 Roger Day
 Roland Ellis
 Darin Patrick Griesey, retired machinist
 Joe Mackey
 Veronikka Ziol

Primary results

Republican primary
 Jim Baird, state representative
 Steve Braun, former state representative
 Kevin Grant
 Diego Morales, former aide to Mike Pence
 James Nease
 Tim Radice
 Jared Thomas, former U.S. Army Captain

Primary results

General election

Results

District 5

The incumbent is Republican Susan Brooks, who has represented the district since 2013. Brooks was re-elected with 61% of the vote in 2016.

Democratic primary
 Dion Douglas
 Sean Dugdale
 Eshel Faraggi, biophysicist and professor
 Kyle Brenden Moore, businessman
 Dee Thornton, businesswoman

Primary results

Republican primary
 Susan Brooks, incumbent

Primary results

General election

Polling

Results

District 6

The incumbent is Republican Luke Messer, who has represented the district since 2013. Messer did not run for reelection as he entered into the Republican primary for the Indiana senate race.

Democratic primary
 George Holland, pharmaceutical salesman
 K. Jasen Lave, writer and musician
 Jeannine Lee Lake, publisher and CEO
 Jim Pruett, attorney
 Lane Siekman, attorney
 Joshua Williamson, industrial technician

Primary results

Republican primary
 Mike Campbell
 Jonathan Lamb, economist
 Stephen MacKenzie, small business owner
 Greg Pence, mall owner and brother of Vice President Mike Pence
 Jeff Smith, manufacturing trainer

Primary results

General election

Results

District 7

The incumbent is Democrat André Carson, who has represented the district since 2008. Carson was re-elected with 60% of the vote in 2016.

Democratic primary
 André Carson, incumbent
 Curtis Godfrey
 Bob Kern
 Pierre Pullins
 Sue Spicer, business owner

Primary results

Republican primary
 John L. Couch
 J. Jason Davis
 Donald Eason Jr.
 J.D. Miniear
 Wayne Harmon
 Tony Van Pelt

Primary results

General election

Results

District 8

The incumbent is Republican Larry Bucshon, who has represented the district since 2011. Brooks was re-elected with 64% of the vote in 2016.

Democratic primary
 William Tanoos, attorney

Primary results

Republican primary
 Larry Bucshon, incumbent
 Rachel Covington, teacher
 Richard Moss, otolaryngologist

Primary results

General election

Results

District 9

The incumbent is Republican Trey Hollingsworth, who has represented the district since 2017. Hollingsworth was elected with 54% of the vote in 2016.

The Democratic Congressional Campaign Committee included Indiana'a 9th congressional district on its initial list of Republican-held seats considered targets in 2018.

Democratic primary
 Dan Canon, attorney
 Rob Chatlos, self-employed
 Liz Watson, labor attorney

Primary results

Republican primary
 James Dean Alspach
 Trey Hollingsworth, incumbent

Primary results

General election

Polling

Results

References

External links
Candidates at Vote Smart 
Candidates at Ballotpedia 
Campaign finance at FEC 
Campaign finance at OpenSecrets

Official campaign websites of first district candidates
Pete Visclosky (D) for Congress
Mark Leyva (R) for Congress

Official campaign websites of second district candidates
Mel Hall (D) for Congress
Jackie Walorski (R) for Congress

Official campaign websites of third district candidates
Courtney Tritch (D) for Congress
Jim Banks (R) for Congress

Official campaign websites of fourth district candidates
Tobi Beck (D) for Congress
Jim Baird (R) for Congress

Official campaign websites of fifth district candidates
Dee Thornton (D) for Congress
Susan Brooks (R) for Congress

Official campaign websites of sixth district candidates
Jeannine Lee Lake (D) for Congress
Greg Pence (R) for Congress

Official campaign websites of seventh district candidates
André Carson (D) for Congress
Wayne Harmon (R) for Congress

Official campaign websites of eighth district candidates
William Tanoos (D) for Congress
Larry Bucshon (R) for Congress

Official campaign websites of ninth district candidates
Liz Watson (D) for Congress
Trey Hollingsworth (R) for Congress

Indiana
2018
2018 Indiana elections